Chain Chomps, known in Japan as  (Japanese onomatopoeia for a barking sound), are metal, barking ball-and-chain-like video-game creatures that are restrained by chains. When not held back by chains, they are sometimes referred to as just Chomps. In their game appearances, Chain Chomps constantly strain against the chain holding them, attempting to break free and bite anything that passes close by.

Development 
Chain Chomps were inspired by a childhood experience of Super Mario creator Shigeru Miyamoto, where a dog tried to attack him. The dog lunged at him, but was jerked back by its leash just as the dog snapped at Miyamoto inches in front of his face. In a 2017 interview, it was revealed that Chain Chomps were originally going to be in Super Mario World, as evidenced by a pre-release sprite sheet.

Appearances

Super Mario series
 Chain Chomps made their debut in Super Mario Bros. 3. Chain Chomps and its different variations appear in all of the Mario RPG games. In games such as Super Mario 64, Super Mario Sunshine, New Super Mario Bros., Super Paper Mario, and New Super Mario Bros. Wii, Chain Chomps can be set free from their chains by ground pounding on their post. Otherwise, they are often indestructible. Chain Chomps also appeared in Mario Kart: Double Dash as a special item for Baby Mario and Baby Luigi and an obstacle on circuit courses, and reappeared as an obstacle in Mario Kart DS and Mario Kart Wii. Also in Mario Kart Wii, a Chain Chomp has its own battle arena known as Chain Chomp Wheel. Chain Chomps are also seen on Rainbow Road in Mario Kart 64, repeatedly biting their way over the course trying to hit the player. Chain Chomps also appear without chains, such as in Super Mario World 2: Yoshi's Island, where they are seen at first from afar, then lunge high into the air and drop down suddenly, creating a huge crater in the ground.

There are also gigantic species called  in which the Chomps chase the player, by "eating" the platform Yoshi is running on until it hits a solid surface. Beginning in Super Mario Bros. 3, some games feature a version of the Chain Chomp appears that has fireballs for a chain and can fly known as Fire Chomps or  In Super Mario Galaxy, Chomps are nearly invincible monsters that roll along a predetermined path. In Super Mario Galaxy 2,  pursue Mario. Chain Chomps appeared again in Super Mario Odyssey as characters that could be "captured" and manipulated, Mario Tennis Aces, where Chain Chomp is one of the playable characters and their special shot has them spin rapidly and fire a powerful shot. and Super Mario Party on the minigames. Chain Chomps also appeared in Mario + Rabbids Kingdom Battle DLC. Chain Chomps also appeared in New Super Mario Bros. U crossover Puzzle & Dragons Z.

Other 
Outside the Mario games, Chain Chomps appear in The Adventures of Super Mario Bros. 3 animated series. They also appear in various installments of The Legend of Zelda series of games (the first of these being in The Legend of Zelda: Link's Awakening), as well as Yoshi's Woolly World, and in Super Smash Bros. for 3DS and Wii U and Super Smash Bros. Ultimate as an assist trophy.

Reception 
According to Polygon, Chain Chomp was ranked as one of the best characters to be played in Mario Tennis Aces. GameDaily listed Chain Chomp as number 14 on their top 25 most ferocious enemies, stating that "While most Chain Chomps are leashed, some do manage to break their bonds and wreck havoc". It was also described by IGN's Audrey Drake as one of the best Mario enemies, stating that "where you had to figure out how to dodge them in a 3D space fast before all of your health went bye-bye".

A variety of Mario-related merchandise depicting Chain Chomps have been produced over the years by Nintendo; this merchandise includes lamps, plush toys, T-shirt, Beanies and cat beds. A parody sculpture of the music video of "Wrecking Ball" by Miley Cyrus including Chain Chomp and Princess Peach has been made by custom figurine artist Kodykoala.

Notes

References

Mario (franchise) enemies
Fictional monsters
Video game bosses
Video game characters introduced in 1988
Video game species and races
Anthropomorphic video game characters
Fictional dogs